The Zambezi flapshell turtle (Cycloderma frenatum) is a species of softshell turtle in the family Trionychidae). Within its family, C. frenatum belongs to the smaller, and exclusively Old World, subfamily Cyclanorbinae.

Geographic range
C. frenatum is found in southeastern Africa, in the countries of Malawi, Mozambique, Tanzania, Zambia, Zanzibar, and Zimbabwe, and mainly in the Zambezi basin.

Conservation status
C. frenatum is becoming rare due to habitat loss.

References

Further reading
Peters W (1854). "Übersicht der auf seiner Reise nach Mossambique beobachteten Schildkröten ". Bericht über die zur Bekanntmachung geeigneten Verhandlung der Königlich Preuissische Akademie der Wissenschaften zu Berlin 1854: 215–216. (Cycloderma frenatum, new species, p. 216). (in German and Latin).

Cycloderma
Reptiles described in 1854
Taxa named by Wilhelm Peters
Taxonomy articles created by Polbot